Geita Airport  is a small regional airport in northern Tanzania serving the city of Geita. The airport has the longest runway and only asphalt runway in the Geita Region.

History
west of the regional capital Geita. The project approximately cost TSh 40 billion and was entirely funded by the Government of Tanzania. The airport was built to serve the region of Geita, a region that produces more than half of the countries gold exports.

The airport got its first scheduled flight in January 2021 by Air Tanzania connecting Julius Nyerere International Airport and Mwanza Airport.

President Magufuli 
The airport is located close to Tanzania's 5th president John Magufuli home town. During various trips to his home region in 2019 and during the early days of the COVID-19 pandemic, when Magufuli decided to stay at home, the airport hosted various regional heads of state for bilateral meetings. These include

 Uhuru Kenyatta, President of Kenya on 
 Filipe Nyusi, President of Mozambique on 11 January 2021
 Sahle-Work Zewde, President of Ethiopia on

Airlines and destinations

Passenger

References

External links

Airports in Tanzania
Buildings and structures in the Mwanza Region